Non-affiliated members of the House of Lords are peers who do not belong to any parliamentary group. They do not take a political party's whip, nor affiliate to the crossbench group, nor are they Lords Spiritual (bishops). Formerly, the Lords of Appeal in Ordinary were also a separate affiliation, but their successors (the justices of the Supreme Court) are disqualified from the Lords until they no longer hold a judicial position.

Most non-party Lords Temporal are crossbenchers. Peers may also be required to sit as non-affiliated while they hold certain senior positions within the Lords, as a means to preserve the neutrality of their official role. Some members become non-affiliated after resigning or being expelled from a party, either through a political disagreement or after a scandal such as the 2009 parliamentary expenses scandal. Others have had no party allegiance and choose this designation rather than joining the crossbench.

Although the Lord Speaker must withdraw from any party affiliation upon their election to the speakership, they are not considered as a non-affiliated peer.

List of Non-affiliated Peers
The UK Parliament website lists the following Non-affiliated members of the House of Lords, including those not currently eligible to sit in the Lords:

List of Independent Peers
There are other peers who list themselves as Independent within the House of Lords:

See also
Members of the House of Lords

References

House of Lords
Lists of legislators in the United Kingdom
House of Lords-related lists